The San Diego free speech fight in San Diego, California, in 1912 was one of the most famous "free speech fights", class conflicts over the free speech rights of labor unions.

Introduction

By the beginning of the 20th century, growing confrontations between the working class and their employers caused suspicion and animosity both within, and against the workers. Striking workers had taken militant action which culminated in the Haymarket Riot in Chicago; the Great Southwest Railroad Strike of 1886 was crushed, destroying the Knights of Labor, coincident with the birth of the conservative American Federation of Labor. In the western United States, the Western Federation of Miners (WFM) inherited the mantle of militant unionism, challenging capital in strikes from Cripple Creek to Canada. Many communities sought to limit the spread of union philosophy by revoking rights granted by the United States Constitution, particularly the freedom of speech granted by the First Amendment.

Industrial Workers of the World

In 1905, the WFM and other unions, together with socialist, and anarchist groups met in Chicago to form the Industrial Workers of the World (IWW) in what came to be called the "First Continental Congress of the working class." The immediate purpose of the IWW was to unite all working people into one worldwide union, regardless of race, creed, sex, skill, or national origin. The ultimate goal was abolition of the wage system, replacing wage labour with worker cooperatives.

The Wobblies, as IWW members were called, frequently engaged in creative tactics, including soapboxing. The IWW orators spoke to workers about bosses, corruption, exploitation, and the unfairness of capitalism. Championing such a direct challenge to capital, members of the IWW faced persecution and prejudice in North America, and throughout the world. In many American cities, from Pennsylvania to California, IWW members found their right to public speech interfered with by local ordinance or police harassment. Thus began the free speech fights of the IWW.

From approximately 1906, the San Diego General Membership Branch of the IWW focused on various small industries, including cigar making and lumber. In 1910, the IWW attempted to organize Mexican workers of the San Diego Consolidated Gas and Electric Company. A successful strike led to the formation of a public service union, which was disbanded when many of the Mexican workers left to participate in the Mexican Revolution.

Events leading to the fight
One of the most brutal and significant of the free speech fights occurred in the Stingaree neighborhood of San Diego, home to the city's "undesirables."  The San Diego Common Council had passed an ordinance to curb Wobbly soapbox orations, resulting in the San Diego free speech fight in which the IWW clashed with law enforcement and vigilantes who were incited to violence by local newspapers.

Ordinance prohibiting free speech
The free speech fight officially began on January 8, 1912, when the San Diego Common Council passed Ordinance No. 4623, which called for a restricted zone of 49-square blocks (more than that which was requested by San Diegans) in the middle of San Diego, encompassing all of "soapbox row." The ordinance came as a result of a recommendation given by the San Diego grand jury and a petition signed by eighty-five prominent citizens and property owners who had hoped to prohibit free speech in a seven-square block zone centered around 5th & E. The meetings blocked traffic, it was officially argued, and that necessitated an ordinance for "the immediate preservation of the public peace, health, and safety and one of emergency." The initial punishment for violating the ordinance was punishable by a $25 to $100 fine and/or thirty days' imprisonment. Prior to passage of the ordinance, the Wobblies, Single Taxers, and Socialists had signed a 250-person petition in which they called for an allowance of unrestricted free speech. This effort countered the petitions previously submitted by the San Diego Grand Jury and the high powered San Diegan citizens, but to no avail.

There was a period of uncertainty, during which the council delayed its decision. The council may have simply been searching for affirmation from the general public in order to avoid widespread conflict and dismay throughout the city. Some council members "believed that a referendum would show that the majority of San Diegans favored speaking anywhere at anytime."

The council finally found a reason to pass the ordinance on the evening of January 6, 1912. The Socialists and Single Taxers were holding a soapbox event on the streets when an off-duty constable and real estate man, R.J. Walsh drove his car into a crowd at the closed-off soapbox row. With his horn blaring, he attempted to disrupt the orators.  His car was mobbed and its tires were slashed. The police intervened and two days later the San Diego Common Council passed Ordinance 4623 with an emergency clause that called for the immediate cessation of public free speech rights, sidestepping the customary twenty-day implementation wait period. The free speech fight had officially begun.

Opposition to the ordinance

The California Free Speech League was created on January 16, 1912, with the support of Socialists, Wobblies, church groups, the AFL and other trade unions. The League attempted to take a legal stand against the free speech restrictions by holding up the Constitution and defending the rights of non-property owning peoples. The League also hired E.E. Kirk as an attorney to provide some legal leverage against the law and its enforcement.

After the passage of free speech restrictions, the Wobblies and other groups began testing the ordinance. At a typical IWW street meeting the police left the Wobblies undisturbed and merely relegated themselves to traffic and pedestrian direction. Indeed, the Wobblies and the Socialists believed that they had already won back their free speech rights. But law enforcement was simply adhering to a generally accepted 30-day grace period after the ordinance was enacted. Once the grace period was over, forty-one people were arrested during a parade and demonstration consisting of 5,000 protesters. Those arrested were jailed for twenty-four hours, held initially on a misdemeanor charge. But the prosecutors decided the violators had conspired to break the law, and thus tried the prisoners under a felony charge of conspiracy. The Wobblies and other soapbox speakers then moved their orations out of the restricted zone. But the council passed an ordinance which gave police the ability to arrest anyone that disrupted traffic throughout San Diego.

Germania Hall incident
The San Diego free speech fight began on February 1, 1912, but confrontation with the San Diego's "old guard" began as early as 1910. On November 10, 1910, Local 13 of the IWW held a meeting to celebrate the martyrs of the Chicago Haymarket Riot. The police closed down the Wobbly meeting place, Germania Hall, before the event could take place. In response, the IWW took their grievances to the streets and began their soapbox free speech campaign. Afterwards, Wobblies who spoke "on the soapbox" were jailed, "fingerprinted, photographed in jail and then released."

In response to the Germania Hall incident, the IWW shifted their efforts to a form of soapbox oratory in order to win over a diverse spectrum of the working class, focusing on gaining converts through their speeches. The fifty members of the IWW refocused their efforts to Heller's Corner at the corner of 5th and E Streets, in the center of the Stingaree. The Stingaree contained a mélange of ethnic groups: ranging from whites, white immigrant, blacks, Mexicans, and Chinese, most of which were members of the working class. The Stingaree and Heller's Corner were symbolic hubs for the San Diegan prejudices against different races and lower classes. The Stingaree was home to everything different and unknown that went against the "mission" ideal in San Diego, including: saloons, shops, cheap hotels, gambling houses, opium dens and prostitutes. The square block at the corner of Fifth and E Streets was home to more than just debauchery, as it also was the central location for a variety of "soapbox orators" including the Salvation Army, Socialists, Holy Rollers, and the Single Taxers. The situation was relatively peaceful and there were no violent run-ins with the police, until after the Germania Hall incident.

Jail conditions and civil disobedience

The increase in arrests led to the rapid filling of the San Diego jails, causing overcrowding and the rapid decline of prison conditions, increasing Wobbly anger toward law enforcement. The reports about jail conditions were conflicting, but the general trend seems to show that the Wobblies and other pro-free speech detainees were treated badly. The jails filled up so quickly that the police used their sobering rooms or drunk tanks for housing inmates. These tanks had no beds and the arrested were forced to sleep on vermin infested concrete floors. Moreover, police brutality and aggression were rampant, while beatings and other abuses were relatively common throughout the ordeal. Sixty-three-year-old Michael Hoy died on March 28 after the police beat him and withheld medical attention.

These events coincided with the plan of the Free Speech League to "glut the jails and then to demand individual jury trials which would clog the courts and bring the legal machinery to a standstill." This especially appealed to the IWW, so much so that they called for 20,000 Wobblies to converge on San Diego in order to bring the system to a halt. There were 50 members of local 13 in 1912, but roughly 5,000 Wobblies came to San Diego to participate in the free speech fight. District Attorney Utley tried to offer a compromise to the Wobblies, promising to free the men originally arrested for conspiracy if the IWW ceased its public speaking in the restricted zone. The IWW declined the offer on principle even through its attorney, E.E. Kirk, recommended that they accept the compromise. The arrests continued. The IWW then protested against the detainment and the prison conditions in front of the city jail. Five thousand protesters turned out, and the police indiscriminately blasted people, including women and children, with fire hoses.

Vigilantes

The increase in arrests left Police Chief Keno Wilson with a dilemma; he wanted to punish the protesters, but simultaneously faced overcrowded jails and stockades. After local newspapers began editorializing vociferously against the protesters and their tactics, groups of vigilantes began transporting arrested Wobblies and free speakers to the county line. The vigilantes began patrolling trains that were inbound from the north, and would grab Wobblies and invited speakers before they could get to the city. The vigilantes then proceeded to "reeducate" the speakers on patriotism as this brutal first hand account notes: They were drunk and hollering and cursing the rest of the night. In the morning they took us out four or five at a time and marched us up the track to the county line ... where were forced to kiss the flag and then run a gauntlet of 106 men, every one of which was striking at us as hard as they could with their pick ax handles. They broke one man's leg, and everyone was beaten black and blue, and was bleeding from a dozen wounds. These incidents occurred quite frequently, but there was no significant outcry from the middle class citizens of San Diego.

The state of California finally intervened, as Governor Hiram Johnson was flooded with demands for an inquiry into the arrests and vigilantism in San Diego. Governor Johnson sent Colonel Weinstock to act as an investigative commissioner. By all accounts Weinstock was an impartial judge of situation, and he concluded that the arrests and free speech restrictions were unlawful, but that the Wobblies were wrong in their pursuance of an activist stance. Moreover, Weinstock likened the situation to Czarist Russia and suggested the Attorney General take action, but he did not. Although Weinstock's presence caused a temporary cessation in violence, the situation was once again aroused when Joseph Mikolash, a Wobbly, was killed by police in the IWW headquarters in San Diego on May 7.

The Wobblies reportedly employed firearms against the police in the incident, which led to the discovery of a small arms cache in the IWW headquarters. This increased the public's hostility toward the IWW and toward Weinstock's report, which had defended the Wobblies' constitutional right to free speech.

Emma Goldman and Ben Reitman

Emma Goldman and Ben Reitman came to San Diego for Goldman to give her speech "An Enemy of the People" on May 15, 1912. When the two arrived at the train station the same women that allegedly needed protection from the soapbox orators yelled "Give us that anarchist; we will strip her naked; we will tear out her guts." Mayor of San Diego James E. Wadham offered a warning, but no help to the two activists. Reitman was abducted by vigilantes from his hotel room and tortured. He later recalled,
They tore my clothes off. They knocked me down, and when I lay naked on the ground, they kicked and beat me until I was almost insensible. With a lighted cigar they burned the letters I.W.W. on my buttocks; then they poured a can of tar over my head and, in the absence of feathers, rubbed sage-brush on my body. One of them attempted to push a cane into my rectum. Another twisted my testicles. They forced me to kiss the flag and sing The Star-Spangled Banner. When they tired of the fun, they gave me my underwear for fear we should meet any women. They also gave me back my vest, in order that I might carry my money, railroad ticket, and watch. The rest of my clothes they kept. I was ordered to make a speech, and then they commanded me to run the gauntlet. The Vigilantes lined up, and as I ran past them, each one gave me a blow or a kick. Then they let me go.Reitman had not been a member of the IWW, although he was a supporter. Emma Goldman then returned to Los Angeles after being misled into thinking that the Vigilantes had not harmed Reitman but simply put him on a train for Los Angeles. Reitman was released a day later and arrived in Los Angeles badly beaten.

By the fall of 1912, the soapbox row had been abandoned. The vigilantes ended their terror campaign, for they had brutalized, driven out, or– some believe– possibly murdered anyone who stood up for the right of free speech in San Diego. This was quite a different result from what the IWW had experienced in its other free speech fights around the country. The Wobblies did not return to San Diego until 1914.

In song

From the July 11, 1912, edition of the IWW's Little Red Songbook, the first stanza of "We're Bound For San Diego":

In that town called San Diego when the workers try to talk,
The cops will smash them with a sap and tell them "take a walk",
They throw them in a bull pen and they feed them rotten beans,
And they call that "law and order" in that city, so it seems.

The bonus track "Tar and Sagebrush" on the Anti-Flag album The Bright Lights of America is a folk punk interpretation of Ben Reitman's description of his torture.

References

Further reading
Emma Goldman, Living My Life (1931), Volume 1, pp. 493–502.
Grace L. Miller, "The I.W.W. Free Speech Fight: San Diego, 1912,", Southern California Quarterly, v.54, no. 3 (1972): 211-238.
Rosalie Shanks, "The I.W.W. Free Speech Movement: San Diego, 1912", Journal of San Diego History, v.19, no.1 (1973): 25-33.
Tom Waller. The Wobblies and San Diego's shame: The battle of Soapbox Row. San Diego Reader, April 2, 1992.
Kevin Starr, Endangered Dreams: The Great Depression in California (Oxford: Oxford University Press, 1996), ch. 2.
Mike Davis, Kelly Mayhew, and Jim Miller, Under the Perfect Sun: The San Diego Tourists Never See (New York: The New Press, 2003), 169-97.
Richard Steven Street, Beasts of the Field: A Narrative of California Farmworkers, 1769-1913 (Stanford, Calif.: Stanford University Press, 2004), ch. 24.
Davey Jones, "A Fight for Free Speech in San Diego", San Diego Indymedia, Jan. 21, 2005.
Randy Dotinga. When San Diego Had Its Own Big Labor Clash. Voice of San Diego. March 15, 2011.
Jeff Smith. The Big Noise: The Free Speech Fight of 1912, Part One. San Diego Reader, May 23, 2012.
Randy Dotinga. Blood, Spies and Terror: The Cost of Activism in San Diego. Voice of San Diego, June 5, 2020.

1912 riots
1913 riots
Industrial Workers of the World in California
Labor disputes in California
History of San Diego
Riots and civil disorder in California
Freedom of speech in the United States
Political violence in the United States
Events relating to freedom of expression
1912 labor disputes and strikes
1913 labor disputes and strikes
History of the Industrial Workers of the World